Juan José Méndez Fernandez (born 27 March 1964) is a cyclist from Spain.

Personal 
Méndez was born on 27 March 1964 in Barcelona, and is from the Catalan region of Spain. He is missing part of his left arm and leg.

Cycling 
Méndez is a C1/LC4 classified cyclist.

Méndez competed at the 2004 Summer Paralympics in cycling. He was the number three cyclists to finish in the Road Trial LC4 race. At the 2005 European Road Cycling Championship, he won a pair of silver medals and a bronze medal. At the 2006 Cycling World Road Championships, he won a bronze medal. At the 2007 World Track Cycling Championships, he earned a bronze medal. He competed at the 2008 Summer Paralympics in cycling.  He was the number two cyclists to finish in the Road Trial LC4 race.  He was the number three cyclists to finish in the Individual Pursuit track LC4 race.

Méndez competed at the 2012 Summer Paralympics in cycling in the Men's Individual C1-2-3 1 km Cycling Time Trial. From the Catalan region of Spain, he was a recipient of a 2012 Plan ADO scholarship. At a two-day para-cycling event in Geneva, Switzerland in December 2013, he finished second in one of the event's races.

References

External links 
 Juan Jose Mendez's webpage
  (2008, 2012)
  (2016)
 

1964 births
Living people
Spanish male cyclists
Paralympic cyclists of Spain
Paralympic silver medalists for Spain
Paralympic bronze medalists for Spain
Paralympic medalists in cycling
Cyclists at the 2004 Summer Paralympics
Cyclists at the 2008 Summer Paralympics
Cyclists at the 2012 Summer Paralympics
Medalists at the 2004 Summer Paralympics
Medalists at the 2008 Summer Paralympics
Spanish amputees
UCI Para-cycling World Champions
Cyclists from Barcelona
Plan ADOP alumni